Jean-Pierre Famechon  (28 March 1945 – 4 August 2022) was an Australian featherweight boxer.

Famechon was the 2003 Inductee for the Australian National Boxing Hall of Fame Moderns category and was the third to be elevated to Legend status in 2012.

Early life and boxing career
Famechon was born in Paris, France. He and his mother, father and younger brother moved from Paris to Ferntree Gully, Victoria, Australia a suburb of Melbourne, in 1950 when he was five. The family then moved to Middle Park another suburb of Melbourne. His mother Antoinette and younger brother Christian moved to Paris a couple of years later; John and his father Andre then moved to Richmond.

Famechon attended Salesian College (Rupertswood) and later Essendon Technical School. He met his wife Elise (née Alves), and they married at St Brigid's Church in Mordialloc in 1970. They moved to Aspendale and later Frankston and had their first child Paul in 1972, and daughter Danielle in 1974.

Over his twenty-year career Famechon developed a reputation for being a skilled boxer whose strength was his defence.  His career record was 56 wins (20 by KO), 6 draws and 5 losses.

His first major win was over Les Dunn to become Victorian Featherweight champion in 1964, then he was Commonwealth featherweight champion in 1967 after defeating the Scot John O'Brien. He became Lineal and WBC featherweight champion on 21 January 1969 after he defeated the Cuban José Legrá on points at the Albert Hall in London.

Famechon defended his WBC featherweight title against Fighting Harada of Japan and won in a controversial points decision. In the rematch for the world title, against Harada in Japan six months later, Famechon decisively won by knocking out Harada in the fourteenth round.

He defended his WBC title on 9 May 1970 in Rome to Mexican Vicente Saldivar and after losing the fight in a close points decision, he retired soon afterwards.

He was trained by Ambrose Palmer throughout his professional career and never fought as an amateur.

Later life
Famechon received the Keys To The City in 1969 on his return to Australia after his World Title win against Jose Legra in London.

Famechon was the first Melburnian to become King of Moomba in 1970 when appointed by the Moomba festival committee.

In 1971, he and long time friend Frank Quill, wrote his autobiography, Fammo.

Famechon was inducted into the Sport Australia Hall of Fame in 1985. He was inducted into the World Boxing Hall of Fame in Los Angeles in 1997. He also was inducted to the Australian National Boxing Hall of Fame in 2003 and to the Frankston Hall of Fame in 2008. In 2013 the Australian National Boxing Hall of Fame elevated him to Legend status.

In 1991 he was badly injured when hit by a car outside Sydney's Warwick Farm racecourse, which resulted in horrific injuries and sustained an acquired brain injury and a stroke. In December 1993 Famechon commenced a new complex brain-based multi-movement therapy rehabilitation program that resulted in his return to a near normal life some 10–12 weeks after the therapy began.

Famechon now has a bronze statue in his home town of Frankston and is only the third Australian boxer to be honoured in this way after Les Darcy and Lionel Rose.

He was appointed a Member of the Order of Australia (AM) in the 2022 Queen's Birthday Honours for significant service to boxing at the elite level.

Famechon died in Melbourne on 4 August 2022 at the age of 77.

See also
Lineal championship
List of WBC world champions
 French Australian

References

|-

External links
 
 "Johnny Famechon: A boxer's story" from All in the Mind (ABC Radio)
 Talk to Johnny Famechon / Australian National Boxing Hall of Fame

1945 births
2022 deaths
Australian male boxers
Boxers from Paris
Commonwealth Boxing Council champions
Featherweight boxers
French emigrants to Australia
French male boxers
Members of the Order of Australia
Sport Australia Hall of Fame inductees
World Boxing Council champions
World boxing champions
People educated at Salesian College (Rupertswood)
People from Ferntree Gully, Victoria
Boxers from Melbourne
Sportsmen from Victoria (Australia)
People from Frankston, Victoria